Haerts (stylized as HAERTS) is a German indie pop music duo, formed in 2011 in New York. The band consists of Nini Fabi (vocals) and Ben Gebert (keyboards, guitars).

The group made their debut with the single Wings, which was called “as flawless as pop tunes come”, by KEXP. They released their first EP, Hemiplegia, in 2013,  their self-titled debut album on Columbia Records in 2014, and the visual EP, POWERLAND, in 2016.

Since then they have released three further singles and toured with bands such as Rhye, Shout Out Louds, Michelle Branch, Washed Out, and London Grammar. Their music has been featured in film and television, in such films and shows as Carrie, Cake, Love, Simon, Pretty Little Liars and 13 Reasons Why.

History
Haerts was originally formed by singer/songwriter Nini Fabi and pianist/producer Benjamin Gebert. The longtime collaborators grew up in Munich, Germany, and had previously performed as the duo Nini&Ben. They moved to Brooklyn in 2010, where they became Haerts and were joined by band members Garrett Lenner (guitars) and Derek McWilliams (bass). They eventually signed with Columbia Records in 2012.

Haerts' 2012 debut single, "Wings", received regular airplay throughout the United States and was also featured as the song of the day by KEXP-FM. They followed up with the release of their second single, "All the Days", in 2013. The song was voted as the "Song of the Summer" by Elle magazine and featured in the 2013 film Carrie. The group's first EP, Hemiplegia, was released in October 2013. It was produced by St. Lucia and contains both of their original single releases. The band's eponymous debut album was released on October 27, 2014 and it features three of the songs from their first EP. Alongside the debut album's release, two singles have spawned from the album, "Giving Up" and a later release "Be the One".

Garrett Ienner and Derek McWilliams left the band in 2015.

In January, 2016 Haerts released the short film, "POWER/LAND", in collaboration with video artist Julian Klincewicz along with the soundtrack EP "POWER/LAND".

In 2017 they released three singles from their second studio album: "Your Love" on March 3, 2017,  "No Love for the Wild" on May 19, 2017, and "The Way" on December 8, 2017.

In the Fall of 2018 they released their second studio album entitled New Compassion through Arts & Crafts Productions, Inc., and embarked on a tour supported by Vlad Holiday for the east coast and midwest North American dates.

On October 7th 2020, they released their new single "For the Sky" featuring Ed Droste, accompanied by an official music video.

Discography

Studio albums

Extended plays

Singles

References

External links
 

2010 establishments in New York City
Columbia Records artists
Indie pop groups from New York (state)
Musical groups established in 2010
Musical groups from Brooklyn
Musical quartets
American synth-pop groups